Stuttgarter Kickers II (also known as Stuttgarter Kickers Amateure or Stuttgarter Kickers U-23) was the reserve team of German football club Stuttgarter Kickers.

The Stuttgarter Kickers II played in the Oberliga Baden-Württemberg beginning in 2000. Previously, the team fluctuated between the Landesliga and Verbandsliga Württemberg. The team was intended to be the final step between Stuttgart's youth setup and the first team, and was usually made up of promising youngsters between the age of 18 and 23, with a few veteran players drafted in to provide experience.

History
The team first earned promotion to the highest league in the region, the tier three Amateurliga Nordwürttemberg, in 1969 and played there for four seasons until 1973 when it was relegated again. It made one more return to this league in 1975–76 but was relegated again and did not return until the league was disbanded in 1978. Instead it became part of the new tier four Verbandsliga Württemberg that year where it played until 1987 with two second places in 1982 and 1983 as its best results.

After three seasons in the Landesliga the team returned to the Verbandsliga in 1990, came second in the league in 1990–91 and earned promotion to the Oberliga Baden-Württemberg for the first time. The team lasted for only one season and suffered consecutive relegations, dropping back into the Landesliga in 1993. After another three seasons in the Landesliga the team returned to the Verbandsliga in 1996. After four seasons in the Verbandsliga it won a second promotion to the Oberliga in 2000 and played at this level with a sixth place in 2010–11 as its best result. Kickers dissolved the team at the end of the 2016–17 season.

Stadium
The Stuttgarter Kickers II played at the Bezirkssportanlage Waldau in Stuttgart-Degerloch and sometimes at the ADM-Sportpark.

Honours
The club's honours:
 Verbandsliga Württemberg 
 Runners-up: (4) 1982, 1983, 1991, 2000

Head coaches since 1994

Seasons
Last seasons of the team:

Key

Past players

References

External links
Profile at fussballdaten.de
Profile at weltfussball.de

Stuttgarter Kickers
Baden-Württemberg reserve football teams
German reserve football teams
Sport in Stuttgart